Sataney Setgalievna Kazanova, better known as Sati Kazanova, (born 2 October 1982 in Kabardino-Balkarian ASSR) is a Russian singer, fashion model, actress and TV personality. Until May 2010, she was one of the three vocalists of the Russian pop girl group Fabrika (Russian: Фабрика; Factory in English). In 2002, she took part in the first season of the Russian talent show Star Factory as a member of Fabrika, where they finished second.

She won the Astra (Russian: Астра) award for most stylish female singer in 2006.

On 5 October 2009 she was awarded the title of Honored Artist of the Republic of Adygea by the President of the republic, Aslan Tkhakushinov.

In 2011, she hosted the show The Phantom of the Opera, and in 2013 she became a participant in the show One to One!.

Personal life
She studied at the Russian Academy of Music and she lives in Moscow.

Sati was born in Kabardino-Balkaria and her ethnicity is Adyge. She is a now Hindu  and a vegetarian and practices yoga. 

On 8 October 2017 Sati Kazanova married Italian photographer Stefano Tiozzo in Vladikavkaz. They previously met at a wedding of common friends and relatives and later started a long-distance relationship, before deciding to marry in less than six months.

The couple are followers of Vishwananda, a Hindu guru from the island of Mauritius.

References

External links
 
 

1982 births
Living people
People from Kabardino-Balkaria
Circassian people of Russia
Russian pop singers
21st-century Russian singers
Fabrika members
Alumni of the Royal Academy of Music
Fabrika Zvyozd
Russian Academy of Theatre Arts alumni
21st-century Russian women singers
Russian Hindus
Winners of the Golden Gramophone Award

Converts to Hinduism from Islam